Rafflesia borneensis is a species in the genus Rafflesia.

References

borneensis